Elaine Sortino (October 28, 1949 – August 18, 2013) was a college softball coach. She was the head coach at UMass from 1980 to 2013.  With 1,185 wins in 34 years as a head coach, Sortino ranks among the highest in NCAA Division I softball coaching victories.

Early years
Sortino was a native of Yonkers, New York, and a 1971 graduate of State University of New York at Oneonta, and earned her master's degree from the University of Bridgeport in 1973.  She was inducted into the Oneonta State Athletic Hall of Fame in 1999.

UMass
Sortino was the head softball coach at UMass from 1980 to 2013. The UMass Softball Complex was renamed Sortino Field in 2012.  She also coached women's volleyball from 1979-1986 posting a 218-134-1 record during her tenure.  She served as Associate Athletics Director and Senior Woman Administrator at the University.

Softball Coaching records and Halls of Fame
Sortino was inducted into the National Fastpitch Coaches Association Hall of Fame in 2004. She led the Minutewomen to 23 Atlantic 10 titles, 21 NCAA Tournament appearances, and 3 trips to the Women's College World Series.  Sortino coached a Honda Award winner, an Olympic Gold Medalist, 21 All-Americans, 15 A-10 Players of the Year, 18 A-10 Pitchers of the Year, 9 A-10 Rookies of the Year, and 133 all-conference team members.  In her career, UMass posted 21 30-win seasons, seven 40-win campaign and one 50-win season.

Later years and death
Sortino was diagnosed with cancer in 2011, and died of the disease August 18, 2013.

See also
National Fastpitch Coaches Association Hall of Fame
List of college softball coaches with 1,000 wins

References

1949 births
2013 deaths
American softball coaches
UMass Minutewomen softball coaches
State University of New York at Oneonta alumni
University of Bridgeport alumni
People from Yonkers, New York
Softball players from New York (state)